Daniel Ángel González Puga or simply Daniel González (December 22, 1953 – February 1, 1985), was an Uruguayan football defender who played for several top-level clubs in Uruguay and in Brazil.

Career
Born in Montevideo, Daniel González started his career in 1974, playing for Fénix., leaving the club in 1979 to play for Portuguesa in Brazil. He scored four goals in the 21 Série A games he played for Portuguesa between 1979 and 1981. He was part of the Corinthians squad that won the Campeonato Paulista in 1982, leaving the club in 1983, after playing 20 Série A games for the club. Daniel González was transferred to Vasco in 1983, playing 26 more Série A games between that year and 1985.

Death
Daniel González died on February 1, 1985, in a car accident in Rio de Janeiro, Brazil.

Honors

Club
Corinthians
Campeonato Paulista: 1982

References

1953 births
1985 deaths
Uruguayan footballers
Footballers from Montevideo
Campeonato Brasileiro Série A players
Centro Atlético Fénix players
Associação Portuguesa de Desportos players
Sport Club Corinthians Paulista players
CR Vasco da Gama players
Uruguayan expatriate footballers
Expatriate footballers in Brazil
Road incident deaths in Brazil
Association football defenders